Vanscoy is a village in the Canadian province of Saskatchewan within the Rural Municipality of Vanscoy No. 345 and Census Division No. 12. Vanscoy is located on Highway 7 near Highway 762 in central Saskatchewan, 29 km southwest of the City of Saskatoon. Rice Lake is to the west, Goose Lake is to the north, and Pike Lake and Pike Lake Provincial Park are to the east. One of the largest economic industries near Vanscoy is Agrium Vanscoy Potash Operations which produces 1,790,000 metric tonnes of potash a year. Community facilities include a circle hall, ice rink, curling rink and ball diamond.

History 
Vanscoy incorporated as a village on June 17, 1919.

Demographics 

Attractions
Within 19 kilometers or 12 miles of Vanscoy is the Otapasoo Trails Recreation Site.  Pike Lake Provincial Park has hiking trails, boating, and marsh land conservation area, and is located 16 kilometers or 10 miles to the southeast of Vanscoy.

Education 
Vanscoy School provides schooling for Kindergarten to Grade 8 within the Village of Vanscoy, after which they generally go to nearby Delisle for Grades 9 to 12.

Media 
Vanscoy is considered part of the greater Saskatoon region and its close proximity to the city allows it direct access to most of its print, radio and television media.

References

Villages in Saskatchewan
Vanscoy No. 345, Saskatchewan
Division No. 12, Saskatchewan